Inner Mongolia Agricultural University (IMAU) is a university in Hohhot, Inner Mongolia, China under the authority of the Autonomous Region government. It is in Hohhot, the capital city of Inner Mongolia Autonomous Region. It was established in 1952. There are over 100 undergraduate degree programs and postgraduate courses across a range of disciplines, including Agricultural, Engineering, Science, Art, Business, and Management.

History
IMAU was established in 1952, with the first president appointed by Chairman Mao Zedong.

Faculty
IMAU has a staff of 2,737, among whom 435 have doctoral degrees and 653 have master's degrees, 101 tutors of doctoral students. IMAU has one professorship from the Yangtze River Scholar Award Plan.

Campuses
There are three campuses — main campus in Hohhot, Salaqi branch campus, and Current Science Park. The campuses cover an area of 15,000 hectares, of which 10,000 acres are for teaching and researching. There are four school-standard stadiums. Library construction area is 3,000 square meters. The value of teaching instrument and equipment amounted to 412 million RMB.

Academics
Over the past 63 years, IMAU has initiated a multi-level management system. Its primary objective is focused on undergraduate studies. IMAU has been paying profound attention to postgraduate, higher vocational and adult educational programs.

IMAU is a multi-discipline university with eight fields of study: Agronomy, Science, Engineering, Economics, Management, Social Sciences and Education. IMAU has succeeded in cultivating more than 70,000 skilled talents in diverse fields of study.

Academic organisations
IMAU has 19 colleges including the College of Animal Science and Medicine, a Department for Physical Education and an Advanced Educational Research Center, two ministry-level key laboratories, one key laboratory of the State Bureau of Forestry, seven regional key laboratories, one state-level open field observation station, three regional engineering technology research centers, and one engineering research center supported by the Ministry of Education.

Academic departments (colleges)
 College of Water Resources and Civil Engineering
 College of Animal Science
 College of Veterinary
 College of Agronomy
 College of Forestry
 College of Ecology and Environmental Science
 College of Mechanical and Electrical Engineering
 College of Economics and Management
 College of Food Science and Engineering
 College of Life Science
 College of Material Science and Art Design
 College of Humanity and Social Science
 College of Foreign Languages
 College of Science
 College of Computer Science and Information Engineering
 College of Energy and Transportation Engineering
 College of International Education
 College of Vocational Technology
 College of Continuing Education

Discipline
There is one state-level key discipline, one key discipline of the Ministry of Agriculture, three key disciplines of the State Forestry Administration and 22 regional key disciplines. IMAU has six first-level and 33 second-level disciplines, which are authorized to grant doctorate degrees. IMAU has established three moving scientific research stations for post-doctorate research. It has 72 second-level disciplines that confer master degrees.

IMAU offers 58 undergraduate programs, 13 of which are offered in Mongolian and Chinese.

Bilingual (Chinese and English) undergraduate programs
 Water Resources Engineering
 Practaculture Science
 Vehicle Engineering
 Animal Quarantine
 Horticulture
 Computer Science and Technology
 Software Engineering
 Computer Network Engineering
 Finance
 Agronomy
 Law
 Economic Management for Agricultural and Forestry
 Food Science and Engineering
 Biotechnology
 Bioscience
 Furniture Design and International Trade
 Wood Science and Engineering
 Landscape Architecture

Achievement
IMAU has acquired scientific research achievements in 265 programs and provincial “Technological Advancement” awards in 18 programs, seven of which are first-class awards. All these have provided extensive technological support and service for the economic construction, ecology and natural forest protection, reforesting the cultivated land, prohibiting herding and encouraging yard-feeding among other developments in the Inner Mongolia Autonomous Region.

The government of the Inner Mongolia Autonomous Region once awarded “Excellent collectivity that had made great contribution in developing our region through technological education” to IMAU.

International exchange and cooperation
IMAU has established broad academic ties with some 20 universities in United States, Canada, UK, France, Australia, Japan, Russia, the Republic of Mongolia, among others. IMAU has collaborative programs with foreign educational institutions. Outstanding achievements have been made in teaching, scientific research, cultural exchange and joint programs.

References

External links
  Inner Mongolia Agricultural University website
  Inner Mongolia Agricultural University website
  Inner Mongolia Agricultural University website

Universities and colleges in Inner Mongolia
Agricultural universities and colleges in China
Educational institutions established in 1958
Education in Hohhot
1958 establishments in China